Ian Stuart Spiro (14 December 19468 November 1992) was a commodities broker who either murdered his wife and children, then killed himself in 1992 or was himself murdered along with his family. Police stated that he was a "low-level conduit by United States government intelligence agencies and the United Kingdom's MI-6" from 1981 to 1986, and the case stirred a conspiracy theory that the family was murdered by assassins or terrorists because of Spiro's history as an intelligence operative.

Murders
On November 5, 1992, Spiro's wife, Gail Spiro, 41, his daughters, Sara, 16, and Dina, 11—as well as their son, Adam, 14, were found shot to death in their beds in their luxurious, rented home in the Covenant section of Rancho Santa Fe, California, north of San Diego. Each  had been shot in the head execution-style with a large caliber handgun as they slept. For the ensuing three days, Spiro was the only suspect in the slaying. On the afternoon of the fourth day, Spiro was found dead behind the wheel of his Ford Explorer in a rocky canyon on the western edge of the Anza-Borego Desert. It was subsequently found that he died of cyanide poisoning and the case was officially declared a murder-suicide ostensibly sparked by pressure from the family's alleged financial problems.

Conspiracy theory
His brother-in-law believed the CIA or Mossad was involved in his death.

References

1946 births
1992 deaths